In the United States, gun culture  encompasses the behaviors, attitudes, and beliefs about firearms and their usage by civilians. Gun ownership in the United States is the highest in the world, and constitutionally protected by the Second Amendment to the United States Constitution. Firearms are widely used in the United States for self-defense, hunting, and recreational uses, such as target shooting.

Gun politics in the United States tends to be polarized between advocates of gun rights, often conservative or libertarian, and those who support stricter gun control, often liberal. 
The gun culture of the United States can be considered unique among developed countries in terms of the large number of firearms owned by civilians, generally permissive regulations, and high levels of gun violence.

History

American attitudes on gun ownership date back to the American Revolutionary War, and also arise from traditions of hunting, militias, and frontier living.

Justifying the unique attitude toward gun ownership in the United States, James Madison wrote in Federalist No. 46, in 1788, that:

The American hunting/sporting passion comes from a time when the United States was an agrarian, subsistence nation where hunting was a profession for some, an auxiliary source of food for some settlers, and also a deterrence to animal predators. A connection between shooting skills and survival among rural American men was in many cases a necessity and a 'rite of passage' for those entering manhood. Today, hunting survives as a central sentimental component of a gun culture as a way to control animal populations across the country, regardless of modern trends away from subsistence hunting and rural living.

The militia spirit derives from an early American dependence on arms to protect themselves from foreign armies and hostile Native Americans. Survival depended upon everyone being capable of using a weapon. Prior to the American Revolution there was neither budget nor manpower nor government desire to maintain a full-time army. Therefore, the armed citizen-soldier carried the responsibility. Service in militia, including providing one's own ammunition and weapons, was mandatory for all men. Yet, as early as the 1790s, the mandatory universal militia duty gave way to voluntary militia units and a reliance on a regular army. Throughout the 19th century the institution of the civilian militia began to decline.

Closely related to the militia tradition was the frontier tradition with the need for a means of self-protection closely associated with the nineteenth century westward expansion and the American frontier. In popular literature, frontier adventure was most famously told by James Fenimore Cooper, who is credited by Petri Liukkonen with creating the archetype of an 18th-century frontiersman through such novels as The Last of the Mohicans (1826) and The Deerslayer (1840).

Ownership levels
 

"Americans made up 4 percent of the world's population but owned about 46 percent of the entire global stock of 857 million civilian firearms." U.S civilians own 393 million guns. American civilians own more guns "than those held by civilians in the other top 25 countries combined."

"American civilians own nearly 100 times as many firearms as the U.S. military and nearly 400 times as many as law enforcement." Americans bought more than 2 million guns in May 2018, more than twice the total number of arms possessed by law enforcement agencies in the United States combined. In April and May 2018, U.S. civilians bought 4.7 million guns, which is more than all the firearms stockpiled by the United States military. In 2017, Americans bought 25.2 million guns, which is 2.5 million more guns than possessed by every law enforcement agency in the world put together. Between 2012 and 2017, U.S. civilians bought 135 million guns, 2 million more guns than the combined stockpile of all the world's armed forces.

Although historically there have been significant differences in respect to gun ownership between different races and sexes, that gap may be closing. For example, women and ethnic minorities saw the sharpest rise of private gun ownership in the United States in 2020 and the ongoing ownership trends do not indicate any sign of abatement. 
Also, in 2020 and 2021 a sharp increase in gun ownership was seen due to the riots and pandemic during that time. Nearly half of the gun buyers appeared to be first-time owners. Over 2 million firearms were purchased during the pandemic alone.

Popular culture 

In the late 19th century, cowboy and "Wild West" imagery entered the collective imagination. The first American female superstar, Annie Oakley, was a sharpshooter who toured the country starting in 1885, performing in Buffalo Bill's Wild West show. The cowboy archetype of individualist hero was established largely by Owen Wister in stories and novels, most notably The Virginian (1902), following close on the heels of Theodore Roosevelt's The Winning of the West (1889–1895), a history of the early frontier. Cowboys were also popularized in turn of the 20th century cinema, notably through such early classics as The Great Train Robbery (1903) and A California Hold Up (1906)—the most commercially successful film of the pre-nickelodeon era.

Gangster films began appearing as early as 1910, but became popular only with the advent of sound in film in the 1930s. The genre was boosted by the events of the prohibition era, such as bootlegging and the St. Valentine's Day Massacre of 1929, the existence of real-life gangsters (e.g., Al Capone) and the rise of contemporary organized crime and escalation of urban violence. These movies flaunted the archetypal exploits of "swaggering, cruel, wily, tough, and law-defying bootleggers and urban gangsters."

With the arrival of World War II, Hollywood produced many morale boosting movies, patriotic rallying cries that affirmed a sense of national purpose. The image of the lone cowboy was replaced in these combat films by stories that emphasized group efforts and the value of individual sacrifices for a larger cause, often featuring a group of men from diverse ethnic backgrounds who were thrown together, tested on the battlefield, and molded into a dedicated fighting unit.

Guns frequently accompanied famous heroes and villains in late 20th-century American films, from the outlaws of Bonnie and Clyde (1967) and The Godfather (1972), to the fictitious law and order avengers like Dirty Harry (1971) and RoboCop (1987). In the 1970s, films portrayed fictitious and exaggerated characters, madmen ostensibly produced by the Vietnam War in films like Taxi Driver (1976) and Apocalypse Now (1979), while other films told stories of fictitious veterans who were supposedly victims of the war and in need of rehabilitation (Coming Home and The Deer Hunter, both 1978). Many action films continue to celebrate the gun toting hero in fantastical settings. At the same time, the negative role of the gun in fictionalized modern urban violence has been explored in films like Boyz n the Hood (1991) and Menace 2 Society (1993).

Political and cultural theories 

Gun culture and its effects have been at the center of major debates in the US's public sphere for decades. In his 1970 article "America as a Gun Culture," historian Richard Hofstadter used the phrase "gun culture" to characterize America as having a long-held affection for guns, embracing and celebrating the association of guns and an overall heritage relating to guns. He also noted that the US "is the only industrial nation in which the possession of rifles, shotguns, and handguns is lawfully prevalent among large numbers of its population". In 1995, political scientist Robert Spitzer said that the modern American gun culture is founded on three factors: the proliferation of firearms since the earliest days of the nation, the connection between personal ownership of weapons and the country's revolutionary and frontier history, and the cultural mythology regarding the gun in the frontier and in modern life.  In 2008, the US Supreme Court affirmed that the right of individuals to possess firearms is guaranteed by the Second Amendment.

Terms applied to opponents
The terms that gun rights and gun control advocates use to refer to opponents are part of the larger topic of gun politics.

The term gun nut refers to firearms enthusiasts who are deeply involved with the gun culture. It is regarded as a pejorative stereotype cast upon gun owners by gun control advocates as a means of implying that they are fanatical, exhibit abnormal behavior, or are a threat to the safety of others. Some gun owners embrace the term affectionately.

The term hoplophobia refers to an "irrational aversion to firearms".

Foreign perspective
The US attitude to guns generally perplexes those in other developed countries, many of which do not understand the unusual permissiveness of American gun laws, and believe that the American public should push for harsher gun control measures in the face of mass shootings. Critics contrast the US reaction to terrorism given how few deaths it causes, with their high death rates from non-terror related gun crime.

See also
 Second Amendment sanctuary
 Global gun cultures
 Gun control
 Gun ownership
 Gun politics
 Gun show loophole
 Gun violence in the United States
 Index of gun politics articles

References

External links
 
 
 DeBrabander, Firmin (2015).  Do Guns Make Us Free?: Democracy and the Armed Society. Yale University Press.  ASIN: B07CGH7R79

Gun politics in the United States
History of subcultures
American culture
Society of the United States
Firearms in the United States